The Argentine Pila is an Argentinian breed of hairless dog. It is recognised by the Asociación Canina Argentina. It is one of a small number of hairless dog breeds; others include the African hairless dog, the American Hairless Terrier, the Chinese Crested Dog, the Hairless Khala of Bolivia, the Peruvian Inca Orchid and the Xoloitzcuintle or Mexican Hairless.

It is closely related to other South American hairless breeds, all of which were originally considered a single breed. It is estimated that approximately 1,700 of these dogs are in Argentina; they are predominantly found in the Salta province in the north of the country.

References 

Hairless dogs
Dog breeds originating in Argentina